The following is an incomplete list of roads in Lantau, Islands District/Tsuen Wan District, Hong Kong.

List

See also
List of streets and roads in Hong Kong

References

Hong Kong
Roads
 
Roads